Chester Golf Club Halt served Chester Golf Club in Chester, Cheshire, England, from 1891 to 1896 on the Borderlands line.

History 
The station was opened in 1891 by the Manchester, Sheffield & Lincolnshire Railway. It was situated to the north of what was later Hawarden Bridge Halt. Work began on developing the line by the North Wales and Liverpool Railway Committee.

References

External links 

Disused railway stations in Cheshire
Railway stations in Great Britain opened in 1891
Railway stations in Great Britain closed in 1896
1891 establishments in England
1896 disestablishments in England